Khwaabon ka Safar with Mahesh Bhatt is an Indian Hindi-language television series which aired on The EPIC Channel. The show is hosted by Bollywood director, Mahesh Bhatt.

The show is based on the history of prominent Indian film studios, the journey of iconic personalities behind these studios, and how they turned their dreams into reality. Mahesh Bhatt in his own captivating narrative style takes viewers on a nostalgic trip of Bollywood films and their backstories.
.

Host
Mahesh Bhatt

Show summary
The show takes the audience through the evolution of Bollywood's landmark film studios and the strength that the founders displayed when faced with adversity. In each episode, famous stalwarts of the Indian film industry pay tribute and share lesser-known facts about the history of the founders of these studios. The show recounts their experience working with the creators of these studios, namely Bombay Talkies, R. K. Studios, and Prabhat Studios among others. It features some of the Bollywood greats from the past who share their stories, including Randhir Kapoor, Sharmila Tagore, and others. The series finale pays tribute to Mahesh Bhatt, recounting his struggle through adversity with grit and determination.

The series premiered on The EPIC Channel on 19 October 2015, with 14 episodes of one hour each. Mahesh Bhatt was chosen to host the show keeping in line with the channel strategy of building a base of 'Storytellers' who would serve as hosts on its various shows and would be experts in their respective fields. Other 'storytellers' included were Naseeruddin Shah, Javed Akhtar, Anurag Basu, Jaaved Jaaferi, Devdutt Pattanaik, and more.

Episodes
Studios covered on the show:
R.K. Studios
Bombay Talkies
Guru Dutt Films Pvt. Ltd.
Prabhat Film Company
Rajkamal Kalamandir
New Theatres
Navketan Films
Filmistan
Filmalaya
Bimal Roy Productions
B.R. Films
Mehboob Khan Productions
Rajshri Films
Mahesh Bhatt & Vishesh Films

References

External links
Official website

2015 Indian television series debuts
Epic TV original programming
Indian documentary television series
Hindi-language television shows
Hindi cinema
Television series about filmmaking